The first season of the D.Gray-man anime series, was directed by Osamu Nabeshima and produced by TMS Entertainment. The series adapt Katsura Hoshino's manga with the same name. The season follows the first adventures of Allen Walker, an Exorcist that wields the power of "Innocence" to fight against The Millennium Earl, an ancient sorcerer seeking to destroy the world with monsters called Akuma. Joining an organization of Exorcists known as the "Black Order", Allen teams up with multiple soldiers to collect other Innocences.

The season initially ran from October 3, 2006 to April 3, 2007 in Japan on TV Setouchi and TV Tokyo. The English adaptation of the first season has been licensed by Funimation and was released in 2009 in North America. Thirteen DVD compilations of the season have been released by Aniplex between February 2, 2007 and February 6, 2008.

Three pieces of theme music are used for the episodes: one opening theme and two closing themes. The opening theme is "Innocent Sorrow" by Japanese rock band Abingdon Boys School, used for the first twenty-five episodes. The two closing themes are "Snow Kiss" by Nirgilis, utilized for the first thirteen episodes, "Pride of Tomorrow" by June for the next twelve episodes.



Episode list

Home media release

Japanese

English

See also

List of D.Gray-man episodes
List of D.Gray-man chapters
List of D.Gray-man characters
List of D.Gray-man Hallow episodes

References
General

Specific

External links
Official website 
Official TMS Entertainment website for the anime 
Official TV Tokyo website for the anime 

2006 Japanese television seasons
2007 Japanese television seasons
Season 1